Successor parishes are civil parishes with a parish council, created in England in 1974. They replaced, with the same boundaries, a selected group of urban districts and municipal boroughs: a total of 300 successor parishes were formed from the former areas of 78 municipal boroughs and 221 urban districts.

Background
Until 1974, almost all of England was covered by civil parishes. The Local Government Act 1894 had created parish councils, but only for those parishes which fell within rural districts. In urban areas the urban district council or borough council was the lowest level of government, even if the district or borough covered several urban parishes. During the twentieth century the number of parishes in urban areas gradually reduced, as many towns consolidated all their urban parishes into a single parish which coincided with the urban district or borough.

Creation
Schedule 7 of the Local Government Act 1972 created the Local Government Boundary Commission for England, and part V of schedule 1 directed it to consult with the existing local authorities and make proposals for the establishment of new parishes. These would have a boundary coterminous with an existing urban district or borough, or if divided by a district boundary, as much as was comprised in a single district. The commission was also to propose names for the parishes.

The concept of successor parishes was a relatively late addition to the Local Government Bill, being added at report stage in response to pressure from the councils of small urban districts and boroughs. It was further allowed that these parish councils would be entitled to be styled 'towns' and have 'town mayors', and retain other charter rights. The mechanism for towns and town mayors was introduced in a government amendment in the Lords in September 1972.

The Secretary of State for the Environment was permitted to give the commission guidance on making their proposals. The stated policy was "to retain elected councils at parish level for small towns but not for areas which are parts of larger towns or continuously built up areas". The original criteria for identifying "small towns" was that they should have fewer than 20,000 inhabitants, or less than 20 percent of the district's population. 

A report was issued by the commission in May 1973. Following the publication of the report, a large number of representations were made. Fifty-two towns in metropolitan districts wished to be granted successor status, of which ten were successful. A similar number of towns in non-metropolitan districts also made representations, of which fifteen were favourably received. The parishes were created by three statutory instruments: the Local Government (Successor Parishes) Order 1973 (S.I. 1973/1110), the Local Government (Successor Parishes) (No. 2) Order 1973 (S.I. 1973/1939), and the Local Government (Successor Parishes) Order 1974 (SI 1974/569).

Where the area of a borough became a successor parish, the powers of the borough corporation under its charter to appoint local officers of dignity passed to the new parish council. Successor parish councils could also apply for the transfer of the coat of arms of the former council by Order in Council. The majority of successor parish councils chose to exercise their right to designate their parish a town, with the parish council becoming a town council. A handful (Chichester, Ely, Ripon, Truro, and Wells) were successors to cities, with the parish council known as a city council.

Civil parishes are not permitted to cross district or county boundaries, and where the creation of a successor parish would cause this to happen, either only part of the former area became a parish or two parishes were formed.

List of successor parishes

Notes
1  Subsequently merged with North Weston to form Portishead and North Weston in 1993; subsequently renamed Portishead
2  Subsequently split into separate Huntingdon and Godmanchester parishes in 1982
3  Subsequently renamed Saltburn, Marske and New Marske
5  Subsequently renamed Wareham Town
6  Subsequently renamed Droitwich Spa
7  Subsequently renamed Swanscombe and Greenhithe
8  Subsequently renamed Dereham
10  Subsequently renamed Holme Valley
11  Subsequently renamed North Turton in 1975
12  Subsequently renamed Chard Town
13  Subsequently split into separate Midsomer Norton, Radstock and Westfield parishes
14  Subsequently renamed Kempston
15  Subsequently renamed St Ives
16  Subsequently renamed Appleby-in-Westmorland

References

Local government in England
Civil parishes in England